Ettuthikkum Madhayaanai is a 2015 Tamil language film directed and produced by K S Thangasamy. The film stars Sathya and Sreemukhi, while Laguparan and Sam Anderson play other pivotal roles. The film released on 27 February 2015.

Cast

Production 
Thangasamy chose Sreemukhi for the leading female role after seeing pictures of her online, following her performances in the Telugu films Julayi and Prema Ishq Kadhal. He subsequently asked her to put on weight to play the role of a TV anchor. The film was primarily shot in Tirunelveli, with 60% complete by August 2013.

The film's soundtrack composed by Manu Ramesan was launched on 12 March 2014.

References

External links 

2010s Tamil-language films
2015 films
Films shot in Tirunelveli